The major tree genera are listed below by taxonomic family.

Flowering plants (Magnoliophyta; angiosperms) 
For classification of flowering plants, see APG II system.

Eudicots (together with magnoliids they are called broadleaf or hardwood trees)

About 210 eudicot families include trees.
 Adoxaceae (Moschatel family)
 Sambucus, Elderberry
 Viburnum, Viburnum
 Altingiaceae (Sweetgum family)
 Liquidambar, Sweetgum
 Anacardiaceae (Cashew family)
 Anacardium, Cashew etc.
 Mangifera, Mango
 Pistacia, Pistachio etc.
 Rhus, Sumac
 Toxicodendron, Lacquer tree etc.
 Apocynaceae (Dogbane family)
 Pachypodium
 Aquifoliaceae (Holly family)
 Ilex, Holly
 Araliaceae (Ivy family)
 Harmsiopanax
 Kalopanax septemlobus, Kalopanax  
 Schefflera, Schefflera
 Betulaceae (Birch family)
 Alnus, Alder
 Betula, Birch
 Carpinus, Hornbeam
 Corylus, Hazel
Bignoniaceae (Trumpet Creeper family)
 Catalpa, Catalpa
 Jacaranda
 Tabebuia
 Cactaceae (Cactus family)
 Carnegiea gigantea, Saguaro
 Cannabaceae (Cannabis family)
 Celtis, Hackberry
 Cornaceae (Dogwood family)
 Cornus, Dogwood
 Family Dipterocarpaceae
 Dipterocarpus, Garjan
 Shorea, Sal etc.

 Ebenaceae (Persimmon family)
 Diospyros, Persimmon
 Ericaceae (Heath family)
 Arbutus, Arbutus
 Eucommiaceae (Eucommia family)
 Eucommia ulmoides, Eucommia
 Fabaceae (Pea family)
 Acacia, Acacia
 Bauhinia Orchid tree etc.
 Caesalpinia, Brazilwood etc.
 Gleditsia, Honey locust etc.
 Laburnum, Laburnum
 Robinia, Black locust etc.
 Fagaceae (Beech family)
 Castanea, Chestnut
 Fagus, Beech
 Lithocarpus, Tanoak etc.
 Quercus, Oak

 Fouquieriaceae (Boojum family)
 Fouquieria, Boojum etc.
 Hamamelidaceae (Witch-hazel family)
 Parrotia persica, Persian Ironwood
 Juglandaceae (Walnut family)
 Carya, Hickory
 Juglans, Walnut
 Pterocarya, Wingnut
 Lecythidaceae (Paradise nut family)
 Bertholletia excelsa, Brazil Nut
 Lythraceae (Loosestrife family)
 Lagerstroemia, Crape-myrtle
 Malvaceae (Mallow family; including Tiliaceae, Sterculiaceae and Bombacaceae) 
 Adansonia, Baobab
 Bombax, Silk-cotton tree
 Brachychiton, Bottletrees
 Ceiba, Kapok etc.
 Durio, Durian
 Ochroma pyramidale, Balsa
 Theobroma, Cacao etc.
 Tilia, Linden (Basswood, Lime)
 Meliaceae (Mahogany family)
 Azadirachta, Neem etc.
 Melia, Bead tree etc.
 Swietenia, Mahogany
 Moraceae (Mulberry family) 
 Ficus, Fig
 Morus, Mulberry
 Myrtaceae (Myrtle family)
 Eucalyptus, Eucalypt
 Eugenia, Stopper etc.
 Myrtus, Myrtle
 Psidium, Guava
 Nothofagaceaed (Southern Beech family)
 Nothofagus, Southern beech
 Nyssaceae (Tupelo family; sometimes included in Cornaceae)
 Davidia involucrata, Dove tree
 Nyssa, Tupelo
 Oleaceae (Olive family) 
 Fraxinus, Ash
 Olea, Olive etc.
 Paulowniaceae (Paulownia family)
Paulownia, Foxglove Tree
 Platanaceae (Plane family)
 Platanus, Plane
 Rhizophoraceae (Mangrove family)
 Rhizophora, Red mangrove etc.
 Rosaceae (Rose family)

 Crataegus, Hawthorn
 Malus, Apple
 Prunus, Almond, Peach, Apricot, Plums, Cherries etc.
 Pyrus, Pear
 Sorbus, Rowans, Whitebeams etc.
 Rubiaceae (Bedstraw family)
 Coffea, Coffee
 Rutaceae (Rue family)
 Citrus, Citrus
 Phellodendron, Cork-tree
 Tetradium, Euodia
 Salicaceae (Willow family)
 Populus, Poplars and Aspens
 Salix, Willow

 Sapindaceae (including Aceraceae, Hippocastanaceae) (Soapberry family)
 Acer, Maple
 Aesculus, Buckeye, Horse-chestnut
 Koelreuteria, Golden rain tree
 Litchi sinensis, Lychee
 Ungnadia speciosa, Mexican Buckeye
 Sapotaceae (Sapodilla family)
 Argania spinosa, Argan
 Palaquium, Gutta-percha
 Sideroxylon, Tambalacoque ("dodo tree") etc.

 Family Simaroubaceae
 Ailanthus, Tree of heaven
 Theaceae (Camellia family)
 Gordonia, Gordonia
 Stewartia, Stewartia
 Thymelaeaceae (Thymelaea family)
 Gonystylus, Ramin
 Ulmaceae (Elm family)
 Ulmus, Elm
 Zelkova, Zelkova

Monocotyledons (Liliopsida)

About 10 Monocotyledon families include trees.
 Asparagaceae (Asparagus family)
 Cordyline, Cabbage tree etc.
 Dracaena, Dragon tree
 Yucca, Joshua tree etc.
 Arecaceae (Palmae) (Palm family)
 Areca, Areca
 Cocos nucifera, Coconut
 Phoenix, Date Palm etc.
 Trachycarpus, Chusan Palm etc.
 Poaceae (grass family)
 Bamboos, Poaceae subfamily Bambusoideae, around 92 genera
 Note that banana 'trees' are not actually trees; they are not woody nor is the stalk perennial.

Magnoliids (together with eudicots they are called broadleaf or hardwood trees)

17 magnoliid families include trees.
Annonaceae (Custard apple family)
 Annona, Cherimoya, Custard apple, Soursop etc.
 Asimina, American Pawpaw
 Lauraceae (Laureddl family)
 Cinnamomum, Cinnamon etc.
 Laurus, Bay Laurel etc.
 Persea, Avocado etc.
 Sassafras, Sassafras
 Magnoliaceae (Magnolia family)
 Liriodendron, Tulip tree
 Magnolia, Magnolia
 Myristicaceae (Nutmeg family)
 Myristica, Nutmeg

Conifers (Pinophyta; softwood trees)

7 families, all of them include trees.
 Araucariaceae (Araucaria family)
 Agathis, Kauri
 Araucaria, Araucaria
 Wollemia nobilis, Wollemia
 Cupressaceae (Cypress family)
 Chamaecyparis
 Cryptomeria japonica, Sugi
 Cupressus, Cypress
 Fitzroya cupressoides, Alerce or Patagonian cypress
 Juniperus, Juniper
 Metasequoia glyptostroboides, Dawn Redwood
 Sequoia sempervirens, Coast Redwood
 Sequoiadendron giganteum, Giant Sequoia
 Taxodium, Bald Cypress
 Thuja, Western Redcedar etc.
 Pinaceae (Pine family)
 Abies, Fir
 Cedrus, Cedar
 Larix, Larch
 Picea, Spruce
 Pinus, Pine
 Pseudotsuga, Douglas-fir

 Podocarpaceae (Yellowwood family)
 Afrocarpus, African Yellowwood etc.
 Dacrycarpus, Kahikatea etc.
 Dacrydium, Rimu etc.
 Podocarpus, Totara etc.
 Prumnopitys, Miro etc.
 Family Sciadopityaceae
 Sciadopitys verticillata, Kusamaki
 Taxaceae (Yew family)
 Taxus, Yew

Ginkgos (Ginkgophyta)
Only one species.
 Ginkgoaceae (Ginkgo family)
 Ginkgo biloba, Ginkgo

Cycads (Cycadophyta)
2 families include trees.
 Cycadaceae (Cycad family)
 Cycas, Ngathu cycad etc.
 Zamiaceae (Zamia family)
 Lepidozamia, Wunu cycad etc.

Ferns (Pteridophyta)
 Cyatheaceae
 Cyathea
 Dicksoniaceae
 Dicksonia

Fossil trees
 Wattieza, the earliest known tree

See also

List of trees and shrubs by taxonomic family
List of Clusiaceae genera

References

Genera
Trees
Trees, genera
.